Megan Farrell (born 26 February 1992) is a Canadian snowboarder who competes internationally in the alpine snowboard discipline.

Career
Farrell has competed at three Senior World Championships in 2017, 2019 and 2021. Farrell's best performances came in 2021. In the slalom event, Farrell finished fourth (the best-ever performance by a Canadian), and in the giant slalom event, eighth (tied for the best Canadian performance ever).

In January 2022, Farrell was named to Canada's 2022 Olympic team in the parallel giant slalom event.

References

External links
 

1992 births
Living people
People from Bracebridge, Ontario
Canadian female snowboarders
Snowboarders at the 2022 Winter Olympics
Olympic snowboarders of Canada